Christophe de Thou (1508 – 1 November 1582) was an eminent French advocate, and the First President of the Parliament of Paris.

De Thou became Président in 1554, and Premier Président on 14 December 1562, of the Parlement de Paris. He also served as chancellor to the Duke of Anjou and Duke of Alençon, and advisor to Henry II of France, Charles IX of France, and Henry III of France.

De Thou was a member of a respected family from Champagne. He was son of Augustin de Thou (d. 1544) and Claude de Thou (d 1523), also Président of the Parlement de Paris, and brother to Nicolas de Thou, the Bishop of Chartres. His son, Jacques Auguste de Thou (1553–1617), became a noted French historian. He was also the husband of Jacqueline de Tuleu and father of Anne de Thou and Jacques Auguste de Thou.

References 

 R. (Roland) Delachenal, Histoire des avocats au Parlement de Paris, 1300-1600, E. Plon, Nourrit, 1885. Page 397.
 Edouard Mougis, Histoire du Parlement de Paris, Tome 3, Burt Franklin Research & Source Works Series #159, Ayer Publishing, New York. Page  216. .
 Julia Pardoe, The Life of Marie de Medicis, vol. 2, Kessinger Publishing, 2004. Page 53. .
 G. H. (George Herbert) Powell, Duelling Stories of the Sixteenth Century from the French of Brantôme, a translation of Discours sur les duels de Brantôme, A. H. Bullen, 1904. Page 117.

1508 births
1582 deaths
16th-century French lawyers
16th-century French people
Provost of the Merchants of Paris